Light of India is a 1929 MGM short silent film short in two-color Technicolor. It was the tenth film produced as part of Metro-Goldwyn-Mayer's "Great Events" series.

Production
The film was shot at the Tec-Art Studio in Hollywood. Director Elmer Clifton was paid $1000.00 for his work on this film and earlier series entry Manchu Love.

Preservation status
Light of India is believed to be lost.

References

External links 

1929 films
American silent short films
Metro-Goldwyn-Mayer short films
Films set in India
Films set in the 1850s
Films directed by Elmer Clifton
Silent films in color
Lost American films
1920s American films